Psychologica Belgica is a peer-reviewed, open access academic journal of psychology. It is published by Ubiquity Press and is the official journal of the Belgian Association for Psychological Sciences. The current editor-in-chief is Steve Majerus (University of Liège).

History 
The Belgian Association for Psychological Sciences was founded in 1946 by Albert Michotte and the first issue of the journal was published in 1951.

References

External links 
 
 Belgian Association for Psychological Sciences

Psychology journals
Ubiquity Press academic journals
Quarterly journals
English-language journals
Publications established in 1951
Creative Commons Attribution-licensed journals